This is a list of Gujarati language films that are released or scheduled to release in 2022.

Box-office collection

January - March

April - June

July - September

October–December

References

External links 

2022
Gujarati
Gujarati